Kapiti Coast United (KCU) is an association football club in New Zealand.  Their home ground is Weka Park in Raumati Beach on the Kapiti Coast.

History
Originally known as the Raumati Hearts, they formed in 1960 as a junior club then two years later added a senior club. Originally named after Heart of Midlothian, an Edinburgh soccer team commonly known as Hearts. The club changed its name to Kapiti Hearts in 2000 then formed as Kapiti Coast United when they merged with Paraparaumu United in 2003.

Their highest honour is winning Capital One three times in 2006, 2014 and 2017, with their highest placing in the Capital Premier league being 6th which they achieved in 2008 and 2015. They have entered the Chatham Cup most years since 1965 with their best run in 1993 as the Raumati Hearts, where they made the last sixteen, before losing 2–3 to Nelson United.

Junior Football
Kapiti Coast United have a large amount of Junior Football teams which participate in both the Wellington and Kapiti leagues. The club have multiple teams in each grade from 7th Grade (aged 6-7) all the way up until their under-16 program.

Senior Football
Kapiti Coast United have 12 senior teams as of 2019 season with their top men's team playing in the Capital Football Capital One and the women's in the Women's Central League. The other teams participate in either the other local Wellington or Kapiti leagues.

First team squad
As of 4 July 2020

References

External links
Official website
Hearts Football Academy

Association football clubs in New Zealand
Sport in the Wellington Region
Sport in the Kapiti Coast District
Kapiti Coast District
Association football clubs established in 2003
2003 establishments in New Zealand